Taxali Gate (Taxali Darwaza) was one of several historic gates of the Walled City of Lahore, Pakistan. Also known as the Taxal, or royal mint, it was built from 1575 -1585 during the reign of the Mughal emperor Akbar. There is a shoe market located here known as Sheikhupurian Bazaar as well as a variety of special food - the most famous are Sri Pai of Fazal Din commonly known as Phajja. Among specialist sweet stores are Taj Mahal and Shahabuddin Halwai. Heera Mandi, a defunct red light district also used to lie close by to this gate, where Mughal Emperors used to keep their royal consorts. Taxali Gate also serves as Union Council 30 (UC 30) in Tehsil Ravi of Lahore City District.

See also 
 Lahore
 Lahore Fort
 Walled City of Lahore
 Badshahi Mosque

References

External links 
 Walled City Has thirteen gates
 Islamic Web Sites About Hazrat Data Ganj Bakhsh

Gates of Lahore
Red-light districts in Pakistan